Raffy is a given name and a nickname. It may refer to:

Rafael Palmeiro (born 1964), Cuban former Major League Baseball player
Ken Raffensberger (1917–2002), American Major League Baseball pitcher
Raffaella Rossi (born 1974), Italian ski mountaineer and skyrunner
Raffy Shart, French-Armenian theater director and writer, film director and screenwriter, composer and songwriter
Raffy Tima (born 1975), Filipino anchor, producer and television host
Raffy Tulfo (born 1960), Filipino senator, host and former broadcast journalist

See also
Rafael Betancourt (born 1975), Venezuelan Major League Baseball right-handed pitcher nicknamed "Raffy Right" by Cleveland Indians fans
Rafael Pérez (baseball) (born 1982), Mexican League Baseball and Major League Baseball left-handed pitcher nicknamed "Raffy Left" by Cleveland Indians fans
Raphy Reyes (born 1987), Philippine Basketball Association player
Raffi (disambiguation)

Lists of people by nickname